Varkala Municipality  is the municipal council that manages a portion of the city of Varkala in Kerala state in India. The Municipality manages the 14.5 km2 area of city of Varkala and has a population of 40,048 in that area. It is the most densely populated municipality in the state capital district Trivandrum.

Statistics

References 

Thiruvananthapuram district
Municipalities of Kerala